Live! Casino & Hotel, formerly Maryland Live! Casino, is a casino hotel in Hanover, Maryland, adjacent to Arundel Mills Mall. It is owned by Gaming and Leisure Properties and operated by The Cordish Companies. It opened in 2012.

The casino has over 3,900 slot machines and electronic table games, 189 live table games, and 52 poker tables. There is parking for 5,000 vehicles in a six-story parking garage. At 17 stories, the hotel is the tallest building in Anne Arundel County.

History
The casino opened its first phase on June 6, 2012, which included 3,200 slot machines and electronic table games. It was built on what was formerly mall parking lots. The second phase opened in September 2012, bringing the total to 4,750 machines.

In December 2012, Maryland Live! transitioned to being open 24 hours a day, 365 days a year. In April 2013, Maryland Live! debuted 122 table games to complement its electronic games and slot machines. A 52-table poker room opened in August 2013.

A 310-room hotel and conference center opened on June 6, 2018, on a site adjacent to the casino building.

In December 2021, Cordish sold the land and buildings to Gaming and Leisure Properties (GLP) in a leaseback transaction for $1.14 billion in cash, stock, and assumed debt. Cordish would pay $75 million of annual rent for the property.

Restaurants
 Bobby's Burger Palace
 Luk Fu
 Morty's Delicatessen
 Noodles Ramen Bar
 The Orchid Kitchen
 The Cheesecake Factory
 The Prime Rib
 David's
 Luckie's

Entertainment
 Live! Center Stage (concert venue)

See also
List of casinos in Maryland

References

External links

 

Buildings and structures in Anne Arundel County, Maryland
Tourist attractions in Anne Arundel County, Maryland
Casinos in Maryland
2012 establishments in Maryland
The Cordish Companies
Casinos completed in 2012